Best of Chuck Brown is a career-spanning greatest hits album by Washington, D.C.-based go-go musician and recording artist Chuck Brown.  The double album was released on April 12, 2005, and consist of a compilation of sixteen digitally remastered songs from his previously released studio and live albums, including "Back It On Up (Sho' Ya Right)", "Run Joe", "Bustin' Loose", and "We Need Some Money".

Track listing

Personnel
 Chuck Brown – lead vocals, electric guitar
 John M. Buchannan – keyboards, trombone
 Leroy Fleming – tenor saxophone, background vocals
 Curtis Johnson – keyboards
 Donald Tillery – trumpet, background vocals
 Ricardo D. Wellman – drums
 Rowland Smith – congas, background vocals
 Glenn Ellis – bass guitar, percussion
 Reo Edwards – executive producer, audio mixing
 Stephan Meyner – executive producer

References

External links
Best of Chuck Brown at Discogs.com

2005 greatest hits albums
Chuck Brown albums
Rhythm and blues compilation albums